The Gilgil River drains part of the floor of the Great Rift Valley, Kenya and the plateau to the east of the valley, flowing from the north into Lake Naivasha. The river runs to the east of the town of Gilgil, which is on the height of land between the Lake Naivasha and Lake Elmenteita basins.

The river has its origins above , where rainfall is around  annually.
It has water year round.
The Gilgil has three main headwaters.

Just north of the lake the river opens into a broad floodplain, through which channels have been dug to support irrigated farming.
The river's inlet to Lake Naivasha is cloaked with Papyrus, other sedges and Typha.
The Gilgil and the much larger Malewa are the main sources of water for Lake Naivasha. Both carry large amounts of sediment into the lake in the rainy seasons. One proposed solution had been to plant hedgerows of Vetiver grass across the delta area, which has been shown in other areas to be effective in trapping silt and also helps wetlands regenerate.

The geologist J.W. Gregory discovered an old settlement on the Gilgil river with obsidian stone flake tools and rough pottery, predating the Iron Age. Tools included skin scrapers, borers and small knives.

References

Sources

Rivers of Kenya